Yashwant Singh (born 1 March 1962) is a member of the Bharatiya Janata Party and has won the 2014 Indian general elections from the Nagina.

Early life and education
Singh was born on 1 March 1962 to Ramchandra and Keshon Devi in the village Churiyala in Muzaffarnagar district in Uttar Pradesh. Singh is a doctor by profession. He gained his M.B.B.S. from Nehru Medical College and M.D. from All India Institute of Medical Sciences, New Delhi. He married Raj Kumari in October 1991.

Political career
Singh was a Member, State Legislative Assembly, Uttar Pradesh for two consecutive terms, from 2002 to 2012. He was a Minister of State (Independent Charge), from 2007 to 2012. In May, 2014, he was elected to the 16th Lok Sabha. From Sep 2014 he is a member of the Standing Committee on Rural Development.

References

Living people
India MPs 2014–2019
Lok Sabha members from Uttar Pradesh
1962 births
Politicians from Meerut
Bharatiya Janata Party politicians from Uttar Pradesh
People from Muzaffarnagar district
Uttar Pradesh MLAs 2002–2007
Uttar Pradesh MLAs 2007–2012